A freeze warning is a warning issued by the National Weather Service when sub-freezing temperatures are expected in the next 36 hours. This can occur with or without frost. When a freeze warning is issued in the fall, that will usually signify the end of the growing season, as sub-freezing temperatures will usually kill all remaining crops. Farmers and gardeners should take action to protect or harvest their herbaceous plants if a freeze warning is issued. A freeze warning is issued several hours after a freeze watch if a freeze continues to be expected.

Example
110
WWUS74 KMOB 081005
NPWMOB

URGENT - WEATHER MESSAGE
National Weather Service Mobile AL
405 AM CST Thu Mar 8 2018

...FREEZING TEMPERATURES EXPECTED ACROSS NORTHERN PORTIONS OF THE
AREA LATE TONIGHT INTO EARLY FRIDAY MORNING...

.Temperatures are expected to drop to near or just below freezing
across portions of interior southeast Mississippi and interior
southwest Alabama late tonight into early Friday morning. Areas of
frost will also be possible across the area during the same time
period.

ALZ051>058-MSZ067-081900-
/O.UPG.KMOB.FZ.A.0001.180309T0600Z-180309T1400Z/
/O.NEW.KMOB.FZ.W.0001.180309T0600Z-180309T1400Z/
Choctaw-Washington-Clarke-Wilcox-Monroe-Conecuh-Butler-Crenshaw-
Wayne-
Including the cities of Butler, Lisman, Silas, Chatom, Millry,
Grove Hill, Jackson, Thomasville, Camden, Pine Hill, Homewood,
Monroeville, Evergreen, Greenville, Brantley, Luverne,
and Waynesboro
405 AM CST Thu Mar 8 2018

...FREEZE WARNING IN EFFECT FROM MIDNIGHT TONIGHT TO 8 AM CST
FRIDAY...

The National Weather Service in Mobile has issued a Freeze
Warning, which is in effect from midnight tonight to 8 AM CST
Friday. The Freeze Watch is no longer in effect.

* TEMPERATURE...A range of 30 to 32 degrees is expected.

* IMPACTS...Temperatures at or below freezing, along with areas
  of frost, could kill sensitive plants and vegetation.

PRECAUTIONARY/PREPAREDNESS ACTIONS...

A Freeze Warning means sub-freezing temperatures are imminent or
highly likely. These conditions will kill crops and other
sensitive vegetation.

&&

$$

See also
 Freeze Watch
 Severe weather terminology (United States)

References

External links
 National Weather Service
 Federal Emergency Management Agency

Weather warnings and advisories